Garudinia pseudolatana is a moth of the family Erebidae first described by Jeremy Daniel Holloway in 2001. It is found on Borneo. The habitat consists of lowland forests.

The wingspan is about 6–7 mm.

References

Cisthenina
Moths described in 2001